Alexandra Dulgheru was the defending champion, but chose not to participate.

Monica Niculescu won the title, defeating Pauline Parmentier in the final, 6–2, 7–5.

Seeds

Main draw

Finals

Top half

Bottom half

References 
 Main draw

Open Feminin de Marseille - Singles